Bensenville is a station on Metra's Milwaukee District West Line in Bensenville, Illinois. In Metra's zone-based fare system, Bensenville is in zone D. As of 2018, Bensenville is the 115th busiest of Metra's 236 non-downtown stations, with an average of 414 weekday boardings.

As of December 12, 2022, Bensenville is served by 42 trains (20 inbound, 22 outbound) on weekdays, by all 24 trains (12 in each direction) on Saturdays, and by all 18 trains (nine in each direction) on Sundays and holidays.

Bensenville station is located on the south side of Main Street across from the railroad tracks. A wide at-grade pedestrian crosswalk provides access between West Main Street and the station. Parking is available along the south side of West Main Street west of Addison Street, but also behind the station house at the intersection of Center & Railroad Streets. Canadian Pacific's Bensenville Yard is east of the station.

Bus connections
Pace

Gallery

References

External links 

Chicago Railfan.net:
Bensenville Station
Bensenville Locomotive Yard, Rail Yard and Other Yard
Station from York Road from Google Maps Street View

Metra stations in Illinois
Former Chicago, Milwaukee, St. Paul and Pacific Railroad stations
Railway stations in DuPage County, Illinois
Railway stations in the United States opened in 1989